Julia Zirnstein is a German football defender, currently playing for SC Sand in the 2nd Bundesliga. She previously played for SC Freiburg in the 1st Bundesliga.

References

1990 births
Living people
German women's footballers
SC Freiburg (women) players
SC Sand players
Women's association football defenders
People from Schwetzingen
Sportspeople from Karlsruhe (region)
Footballers from Baden-Württemberg